Miguel Castro Enriquez (born September 29, 1951), professionally known as Mike Enriquez, is a Filipino television and radio newscaster. He is also the Consultant for radio operations of GMA Network, and president of the network's regional and radio subsidiary, RGMA Network Inc., and the Station Manager of Super Radyo DZBB 594 AM.

Career
He started his career in broadcasting as a staff announcer at the Manila Broadcasting Company in 1969. It began when he visited a friend in that company and accidentally discovered his interest in radio. He has since worked in various positions, as a broadcast reporter, a news editor, program director, and station manager, until he became manager of a medium-sized radio network. He also had stints in other radio networks such as Freedom Broadcasting Radio Network and Radio Mindanao Network (RMN), where he became vice president for the company. He was the man behind the huge success of DWKC 93.9, which stayed in the number 1 spot for so many years before he left in 1995. He is the voice behind the Mellow Touch 94.7 signature and introduction. He also became a disc jockey known as "Baby Michael" and he played a cameo role as a disc jockey in Andrew E.'s 1992 movie Mahirap ang Maging Pogi (It's Not Easy Being Handsome).

In 1994, after leaving RMN, Enriquez would join GMA to head its radio division and expand its radio networks, with only 4 originating stations at that time.

In 1995, Enriquez was convinced by the network to be the anchor, in what would be his first on-cam appearance, of the 1995 senatorial election coverage, with then broadcast journalist Karen Davila (who moved to ABS-CBN 6 years later) as co-anchor. He would later remark numerous times, "Itong mukhang ‘to sa palagay mo pang TV ito?"

Months later, the network executives called for him to come back; he would anchor a 15-minute newscast, in the early evening slot, together with Davila. The late-afternoon news program, entitled Saksi: GMA Headline Balita premiered on October 2, 1995.

In September 1998, Enriquez would land his anchor-duties into the late-night newscast GMA Network News with Vicky Morales. Since his first months on Network News, they decided to change the language to "Taglish", and later, changed to Filipino in 1999.

In January 1999, Enriquez returned to radio via Super Radyo DZBB, with his new program based on his former newscast, Saksi sa Dobol B; in August 1999, he returned to Saksi, w/ his co-host in GMA Network News Vicky Morales.

In August 2000, Enriquez hosted the public affairs program entitled Imbestigador; he was later named "Imbestigador ng Bayan".

On March 12, 2004, Enriquez left Saksi to re-join Frontpage anchor Mel Tiangco in GMA's newest primetime newscast 24 Oras.

Throughout his career as a news anchor, he would cover numerous news events ranging from the Payatas landslide, the eve of the Iraq War, the Funeral of Pope John Paul II Vatican, and Tacloban, which was then ravage from the aftermath of Typhoon Haiyan.

He has been named as one of the most child-friendly personalities by the Southeast Asian Foundation for Children and thrice consecutively by the Anak TV Seal awards.

On August 22, 2018, Enriquez revealed he has been on a medical leave because of a couple of ailments, which is why he hasn't been in 24 Oras and Super Radyo DZBB lately and he returned on November 26, 2018.

In December 2021, Enriquez took another medical leave of absence, and returned to his programs on March 28, 2022, in time for the Eleksyon 2022 coverage.

Personal life
Enriquez is the eldest of three children. He uses the term "destructive to a certain extent" to describe his curiosity-filled, active childhood.

He had always been very active in church, and used to be an altar boy with an ambition to be a Franciscan priest. However, his parents refused to sign a consent sheet that would allow him to stay at the seminary until he became a priest.

Instead, he was enrolled at De La Salle College (now De La Salle University-Manila), taking up AB Liberal Arts in Commerce. Enriquez finished his degree in 1973 and now teaches in Broadcast Management. He is currently a member of the Board of Trustees of La Salle Green Hills and acts as the Treasurer and Chairman of its Finance Committee.

Family
Enriquez has been married to Lizabeth "Baby" Yumping, but they have no children.

Television Programs

Awards

References

1951 births
Living people
People from Santa Ana, Manila
De La Salle University alumni
Filipino DJs
Filipino radio journalists
Filipino television news anchors
GMA Network personalities
GMA Integrated News and Public Affairs people
GMA Network (company) people